Logan Bolopue  (born 19 November 1994 in Beach Creek, Pennsylvania, United States), is a National motorcycle trials rider. Bolopue won the American NATC Expert National Championship and currently rides in the NATC Pro Class for Sherco.

Biography
Bolopue has progressed through the trials ranks quickly, winning the junior class after his debut season in 2009 then following up with a championship win in the 125cc expert class in 2010. 

In 2011 Bolopue moved up to the Expert class and won the title ahead of defending champion Ray Peters. 

He moved up to the Pro class in 2012 and in 2013 finished 3rd behind Patrick Smage and Bryan Roper. 

The 2014 championship was again won by Smage with Czech rider Martin Matejick runner-up and Bolopue in 3rd for the season.

National Trials Championship Career

International Trials Championship Career

Honors
 NATC Junior Champion 2009
 NATC 125cc Expert Trials Champion 2010
 NATC Expert Trials Champion 2011

Related Reading
NATC Trials Championship
FIM Trial European Championship
FIM Trial World Championship

References 

1994 births
Living people
American motorcycle racers
Motorcycle trials riders